Married People is a 1922 American silent drama film directed by Hugo Ballin and starring Mabel Ballin, Percy Marmont and Ernest Hilliard.

Cast
 Mabel Ballin as Dorothy Cluer
 Percy Marmont as Robert Cluer
 Ernest Hilliard as Lord Cranston
 Bobby Clarke as Timmy
 Dick Lee as Mike
 Bertha Kent as Mary
 John Webb Dillion as Bleauvelt 
 Louis Dean as The Doctor
 Charles Fang as The Chinese
 Nanci Price as Betty

References

Bibliography
 Munden, Kenneth White. The American Film Institute Catalog of Motion Pictures Produced in the United States, Part 1. University of California Press, 1997.

External links
 

1922 films
1922 drama films
1920s English-language films
American silent feature films
Silent American drama films
American black-and-white films
Films directed by Hugo Ballin
Films distributed by W. W. Hodkinson Corporation
1920s American films